9mm: São Paulo is a Brazilian crime drama television series produced by Fox Networks Group in partnership with Moonshot Pictures and released on June 10, 2008.

The series was created by Roberto D'avila, Newton Cannito and journalist Carlos Amorim, author of the book "CV PCC - A Irmandade do Crime" and is the first Fox Channel Latin America original series produced in Brazil.

Premise
Inspired by real police cases the series follows the daily life of the homicide division of São Paulo and the police team formed by the protagonists Horácio, Eduardo, Luísa, Tavares and 3P.

Cast
 Norival Rizzo as Horácio Pereira
 Luciano Quirino as Eduardo Vilaverde
 Clarissa Kiste as Luísa Camargo
 Nicolas Trevijano as 3P (Pedro Paulo Pacheco)
 Vinícius Ricci as Gilson

Interesting facts
 Some episodes from the series were used in  music video "Senhoras e Senhores".

References

External links
 

2008 Brazilian television series debuts
2011 Brazilian television series endings
2000s Brazilian television series
Brazilian crime television series
Brazilian drama television series
Portuguese-language television shows
Police procedural television series
Television shows filmed in São Paulo (state)
Television shows set in São Paulo